Blowdown is an internationally broadcast documentary television series that follows a team of explosive demolition experts as they prepare and implode iconic, complex and challenging structures around the world.

The series airs on National Geographic Channel International, History Television in Canada, DMAX in Germany and Five in the United Kingdom, and is produced by Parallax Film Productions Inc..

The hour-long shows focus on the dangers, challenges, and inside strategies of this type of demolition by documenting the work of a specialized explosives team: Controlled Demolition Incorporated of Phoenix, Maryland, USA.
 
Using a combination of exclusive footage, high-concept visual effects and process-driven computer models, Blowdown explains the complex science behind CDI’s mission.

The series highlights obstacles the team encounters as they rely on experience and intuition to reverse engineer structures designed to be indestructible.

Episodes

Season One 2008
Season One episodes include the explosive demolition of:

Four cooling towers at an active nuclear power plant;
A rocket launch tower at Cape Canaveral;
A landmark Las Vegas casino hotel on the Las Vegas Strip; and
A resort complex on Miami’s dense coastline

Season Two 2011 
Season Two episodes include the explosive demolition of:

A massive sports stadium in Indianapolis;
A former spy ship, the Hoyt S. Vandenberg;
A brand-new hurricane-resistant tower on South Padre Island; and
A 100,000-seater sports venue, the Fonte Nova Stadium in Brazil, shot in 3D

References

External links
Parallax Film Productions Inc.
Controlled Demolition, Inc.

2008 American television series debuts
2011 American television series endings
2000s American documentary television series